USS Portland (LPD-27) is a  ship of the United States Navy, named after the U.S. city of Portland, Oregon.

History
Portlands keel was laid down on 2 August 2013, at the Ingalls Shipbuilding yard in Pascagoula, Mississippi. 
The ship's sponsor is Bonnie Amos, wife of U.S. Marine Corps Commandant General James F. Amos. Portland was launched on 13 February 2016, and she was delivered to the Navy on 18 September 2017. She was commissioned on 14 December 2017, but her commissioning ceremony was not held until 21 April 2018, when she was in the city of Portland for the festivities. The commissioning ceremony was protested by a number of local anti-war groups, who opposed a warship being named after the city.

Laser weapon system

In May 2020, USS Portland successfully destroyed an unmanned aerial vehicle (UAV) with the solid-state laser, Technology Maturation Laser Weapon System Demonstrator (LWSD) MK 2 MOD 0 with a power level of 150 kW. On December 14, 2021, the LaWS successfully destroyed a marine target floating in the Gulf of Aden.

2022

Spacecraft recoveries

Portland was assigned as the recovery ship for the Orion capsule of the Artemis 1 uncrewed Moon-orbiting mission, successfully completed on 11 December 2022. The spacecraft's floating Orion capsule was pulled into the flooded well deck at the stern of the vessel off the coast of Baja California.

References

External links 

 

 

San Antonio-class amphibious transport docks
Space capsule recovery ships